Nill may refer to:

 Blake Nill (born 1962), former Canadian football defensive lineman
 Jim Nill (born 1958), Canadian former ice hockey player
 Maik Nill (born 1963), German weightlifter
 Rabbit Nill (1881-1962), Major League Baseball second baseman
 Jessica Schmidt (born 1979 as Nill), German chess grandmaster